Dato' Keramat LRT station is a Malaysian rapid transit station that forms part of the Kelana Jaya Line in the Klang Valley.

Dato' Keramat LRT station comes from the name of Jalan Dato Keramat. The intention of the station is to serve the Kampung Datuk Keramat as well as enclosed areas, it's a large zone in the Titiwangsa constituency. Dato Keramat Wet Market, Sekolah Datuk Keramat 1 and Sekolah Kebangsaan Datok Keramat 2 are within walking distance to this station.

As an elevated station, Dato Keramat station contains two levels: The access points at street level, and the ticket area and adjoining platforms on the two elevated levels. All levels are linked via stairways, escalators and elevators designated for disabled passengers.
The station uses a 2 side platforms along two tracks for trains traveling in opposite direction and it is entirely sheltered by a gabled roof supported by latticed frames.

Trunk buses

References

External links
Kuala Lumpur MRT & LRT Integrations

Kelana Jaya Line
Railway stations opened in 1999
1999 establishments in Malaysia
20th-century architecture in Malaysia